Salbit (also spelled Selbît) was a Palestinian Arab village located  southeast of al-Ramla.  Salbit was depopulated during the 1948 Arab–Israeli War after a military assault by Israeli forces. The Israeli locality of Shaalvim was established on the former village's lands in 1951.

History

Hebrew Bible

Roman and Byzantine periods
Jerome (347-420) describes it as part of the territory of the Dan, transcribing its name at that time as Selebi, a form also used by Josephus (37-c. 100).

In 1949, archaeologists excavated the remains of a Samaritan synagogue there that was dated to the late 4th or early 5th century. Measuring 15.4 x 8 metres, its mosaic floor contains one Greek inscriptions and two in Samaritan (language and script). In the centre of the mosaic is a mountain which is thought to be a depiction of Mount Gerizim, the holiest site in Samaritanism. Rectangular in shape, the synagogue was longitudinally aligned more or less towards Mount Gerizim.

Ottoman period
In 1838, it was noted as Selbit, a Muslim village in the Ibn Humar area in the District of Er-Ramleh.

In 1883 the PEF's Survey of Western Palestine (SWP) described Selbit: "Foundations and caves. The ruins are extensive. A square building stands in the middle. There is a ruined reservoir lined with cement, and walls of rubble."

British Mandate
In the 1922 census of Palestine, conducted by the British Mandate authorities, Selbit had a population of 296, all Muslims, increasing in the 1931 census, when it was counted together with Bayt Shanna, to 406, still all Muslims, in a total of 71 houses.

The houses in Salbit were made of adobe and stone and were grouped around the village center where the mosque, suq and elementary school was located. The school, built in 1947, had 47 students. The villagers made their living by agriculture and the raising of livestock. The village's drinking water came from a local well.

In the 1945 statistics, the population was 510, all Muslims, while the total land area was 6,111 dunams, according to an official land and population survey. Of this, a total of 4,066  dunums of land were used for cereals, 16 dunums were plantations or  irrigated land, while 31 dunams were classified as built-up public areas.

1948 war and aftermath

During the 1948 Arab–Israeli War and the 1948 Palestinian expulsion from Lydda and Ramle, some of those forcibly expelled were bussed to Latrun on the front lines and from there ordered to walk northward to Salbit. The Lydda death march, as it also became known as, brought hundreds of refugee families to Salbit where they took shelter in a fig grove and were given water and rest for the night before trucks from the Arab Legion began moving some of the families to a Palestinian refugee camp in Ramallah.

Salbit itself was depopulated after a military assault by Israeli forces on 15–16 July 1948. After its depopulation, Israeli forces headed by Yigal Allon used it as a base from which to launch an attack on the strategic hill of Latrun on 18 July, which was spurned by the forces of the Arab Legion who managed to hold on to the site without inflicting any casualties on the Israeli forces. The village structures of Salbit were subsequently completely destroyed, and according to Walid Khalidi, all that remains of the village today are "some cactus plants and shrubs." The estimated number of Palestinian refugees from Salbit as of 1998 was 3,633.

The kibbutz of Shaalvim, named per the site's biblical place name, was established on the former village lands on 13 August 1951 by a Nahal group from the ESRA movement.

References

Bibliography

External links
Welcome to Salbit
Salbit, Zochrot
Survey of Western Palestine, Map 17:   IAA, Wikimedia commons

Arab villages depopulated during the 1948 Arab–Israeli War
Ancient Samaritan settlements